Feridun Zaimoğlu (born 4 December 1964, in Bolu) is a German author and visual artist of Turkish descent.

Since 1995 Zaimoğlu has become one of the important poets of contemporary German language. His central themes are the problems of the second and third generation of Turkish immigrants to Germany.

Life 
Feridun Zaimoğlu, born in Bolu/Turkey, came to Germany with his parents in 1965. Until 1985 he lived in Berlin and Munich, and then began studying medicine and arts in Kiel, where he is still living. He works as an author and journalist. His essays and critiques of literary have appeared in leading German newspapers, such as Die Zeit, Die Welt, SPEX and the Tagesspiegel. From 1999 to 2000 he worked in Mannheim at the National theatre. In 2003 he became Island poet on the island of Sylt, and in 2004 he was a visiting fellow at the Freie Universität Berlin.

His first book "Kanak Sprak" 1995 attempts to express the authentic, tough and subversive power of slang language spoken by Turkish male youths in Germany, and calls for a new self-confidence.

The grotesque figure of the maganda – as can also be traced in popular satirical Turkish magazines – emerges as an "important medium for the formulation of new gender identities, urban subjectivities, and class relations" (Ayse Oncu in References 1, p. 187) His book became inspirational for the group "kanak attak".

In 2005, his installation of flags with the title "KanakAttak – The 3rd Turkish siege of Vienna" was exhibited at the Kunsthalle Wien, an art gallery in Vienna. It refers to the Siege of Vienna (17 July – 12 September 1683) that was an expedition by the Turks against the Habsburg Holy Roman Emperor Leopold I that ended in their defeat.

In his latest book, Leyla, he describes the life in a small Turkish village. It is a kind of 'reinvention' after years of writing in an explicitly male style, as he takes first time in his writing career the female viewpoint. In an interview he describes that it took him one and a half years to prepare for this fiction novel that he finished in 2004 and which is published in 2006.

Kanak Attak

The group that Feridun Zaimoğlu helped to start is a "broadly-based anti-racist project" made up of "different people from diverse backgrounds who share a commitment to eradicate racism from German society". This broad base allows Germans of all colors and ethnicities to join in working toward the cause of ending "the assignment of ethnic identities and roles; the 'we' and 'them'". Although this abandonment of the 'we' and 'them' may seem like the first step toward allowing Turkish-Germans, in addition to other ethnic groups that have come to Germany as migrant workers, to assimilate into German society and the German culture, that is hardly the case.

The "anti-assimilationalist stance represented by 'Kanak Attak'" shows up throughout their writings, such as when they reject people and groups who tell them " who does not want to 'adapt' (read assimilate) into the open society has no business in enlightened Germany". Instead, Kanak Attak believes that there can be an enlightened Germany without erasing the cultures and backgrounds of the foreigners. The group believes that "the idea that the 'mixture of people' must somehow be regulated and controlled" is wrong as well, and instead feels that there should be no distinctions made on race at all.

Another contradiction that the anti-racist group faces is the fact that, despite their ties to the hip-hop generation and its struggles and beliefs, Kanak Attak takes special measures to distance itself from hip-hop. Feridun Zaimoğlu, the "spiritual leader" of the group uses the same language in his writing that is "spoken by the disenfranchised youth of the hip-hop generation". However, the group seems intent on destroying any preconceptions that the group is linked to hip-hop when they write that Kanak Attak "should not be seen as the 'cool voice' of the ghetto". Once again, Kanak Attak takes offense at this generalization that is offered up by the "commercial vultures of the cultural industries", just as it takes offense at any attempt to push cultural assimilation or mixing on the group and its members. Although there are a few contradictions in its doctrine, Kanak Attak represents the growing anti-racist movement in Germany among immigrants who want to be German but also wish to retain their own cultural heritage.

Books 
Kanak Sprak, 1995, 
Abschaum. Novel, 1997,  (2000 as film with the title Kanak Attak)
Koppstoff, 1999, 
Liebesmale, scharlachrot. Novel, 2000, 
Kopf und Kragen. 2001, 
German Amok. Novel, 2002, 
Leinwand. Novel, 2003, 
Twelve Grams of Happiness. Stories, 2004, 
Leyla. Novel, 2006,

Awards and prizes 
1997 Civis-Medienpreis
1998 Screen play Prize of Schleswig-Holstein/Germany
2002 Friedrich-Hebbel-Preis
2003 Prize of the Jury at the Ingeborg-Bachmann-Competition for his narrative Häute (skins)(Published in his volume Zwölf Gramm Glück)
2005 Adelbert von Chamisso Prize
2005 Villa Massimo, Rome – Scholarship
2005 Hugo Ball Prize of the City of Pirmasens
2007 Carl-Amery-Literaturpreis
2007 Grimmelshausen-Preis

References 
 [1] Kültür fragmanlari: Türkiye'de gündelik hayat/Deniz Kandiyoti, Ayse Saktenber: Fragments of Everyday Life Culture in Turkey, translated by Zeynep Yelçe, Istanbul, Metis Publishing House, 2003.

Further reading

 Adelson, Leslie A. The Turkish Turn in Contemporary German Literature: Toward a New Critical Grammar of Migration. New York: Palgrave Macmillan, 2005.
Feridun Zaimoglu – in Schrift und Bild. Beiträge zum Werk des Autors und Künstlers, ed. by Rüdiger Schütt. Kiel 2011,

External links 
 Commented collection of links
 Two reading samples from Twelve Grams of Happiness (in German, English and Arabic)
From Turkish boy to German writer Author Feridun Zaimoglu describes how growing up on a German diet eventually bore literary fruit at signandsight.com
 "From "Educated Kanakster" to Literary Star" Eren Güvercin traces his path from the early days of Kanak Sprak to his current high.

1964 births
Living people
People from Bolu
Turkish emigrants to West Germany
Turkish writers in German
German artists
German male writers
People from Kiel